WLRQ-FM (99.3 MHz "Lite Rock 99.3") is a commercial radio station licensed to Cocoa, Florida, and serving the Space Coast including Melbourne and Brevard County. It broadcasts an adult contemporary radio format, switching to Christmas music for much of November and December. On weekdays, WLRQ-FM carries syndicated shows from John Tesh "Intelligence for Your Life" in middays and Delilah's request and dedication show in the evening. Saturday mornings feature the Ellen K show from co-owned KOST Los Angeles.

WLRQ-FM has an effective radiated power (ERP) of 50,000 watts.  The station broadcasts using HD Radio technology.  The HD-2 digital subchannel formerly carried a beach music and oldies format.

History
On , the station signed on the air.  The call sign was WEZY-FM, with the EZ standing for easy listening and beautiful music.  WEZY-FM played quarter hour sweeps of mostly instrumental cover versions of popular songs, as well as Broadway and Hollywood show tunes.  But by the 1980s, the easy listening format was aging.  At first WEZY-FM added more soft vocals and reduced the instrumentals.  But by the late 1980s, it had made the transition to soft adult contemporary.

On , the station changed its call sign to WLRQ-FM.  The new call letters helped separate the station from its beautiful music past, aiming at a more youthful audience, representing the new moniker Lite RocQ (Rock).

References

External links

LRQ-FM
Radio stations established in 1982
IHeartMedia radio stations
1982 establishments in Florida